Monster Mythology, published by TSR in 1992, is a sourcebook about non-human deities that can be used in fantasy role-playing games using the second edition rules for Advanced Dungeons & Dragons (AD&D).

Description
Monster Mythology is a 128-page leatherette-bound trade paperback written by Carl Sargent, with interior artwork by John and Laura Lakey, Keith Parkinson, and Terry Dykstra. It was the fourth book in the Dungeon Master's Guide Rules series that was created for the second edition of AD&D. The purpose of the book is to detail non-human deities, which, to that point, had not been described for this edition of AD&D. As author Shannon Applecline points out, "Though the book is putatively a 'monster' mythology, it actually contains deities for demihumans, humanoids, and monsters alike." It contains detailed information on the societies, cultures, myths, and deities of several non-human pantheons, including those of the elves, dwarves, gnomes, halflings, orcs, goblins, dragons, giants, drow, and many other creatures. Keith Eisenbeis suggests the book can be thematically divided in two, with the first encompassing typical player character races, and the second detailing "gods of the major intelligent societal creatures".

Contents

Introduction
The introduction sets out the theme of the book — non-human deities — and provides notes on using deities in a campaign, their common abilities, and how they are arranged in four tiers of power from Demigod up to Greater God.

The Gods
The majority of the book describes 131 divine beings, divided into eight mythos sections. Each entry includes a description, some game statistics including the deity's alignment, the most common alignment of its worshippers, the god's area of control, and the god's symbol). Each section also describes the god's avatar and priesthood.

Appendices

Appendix 1: Avatars in Game Play
This section gives some further advice on how avatars may be developed in play, such as where an avatar might make its home, when it might become a patron of a group of adventurers or take on an adventurer as a sidekick, require rescue, lose a magic item, need to be found by player characters, or become enamored with a mortal character.

Appendix 2: Deities and Game Worlds
This short appendix gives references where a Dungeon Master may find 2nd edition AD&D details on the deities of specific game worlds, such as the Forgotten Realms, Greyhawk, Dragonlance, and Dark Sun.

Reception
In the May-June 1993 edition of White Wolf Magazine (Issue 36), Keith Eisenbeis thought Monster Mythology was a "good product", but believed that the priests described were too powerful and unbalanced the game. Additionally, Eisenbeis thought inequities in the ability of priests to advance based on race were unfair. Overall, he gave the book an average rating of 3 out of 5.

Writing in 2014, Shannon Appelcline called author Carl Sargent "one of TSR's best-respected authors in the 90s", and commented that this book "more than doubled the count of humanoid, demihuman, and monstrous deities. In particular it detailed new gods for underdark races like beholders, illithids, myconids, and svirfnebli, new undersea gods, new draconic gods, and new faerie gods (including Shakespearian favorites Titania and Oberon)."

See also 

 List of Dungeons & Dragons deities

References

Dungeons & Dragons sourcebooks
Role-playing game supplements introduced in 1992